The Immediate Geographic Region of Guanhães is one of the 4 immediate geographic regions in the Intermediate Geographic Region of Governador Valadares, one of the 70 immediate geographic regions in the Brazilian state of Minas Gerais and one of the 509 of Brazil, created by the National Institute of Geography and Statistics (IBGE) in 2017.

Municipalities 
It comprises 20 municipalities.

 Cantagalo  
 Coluna  
 Divinolândia de Minas  
 Dom Joaquim 
 Dores de Guanhães  
 Frei Lagonegro   
 Guanhães   
 José Raydan  
 Materlândia 
 Paulistas   
 Peçanha   
 Rio Vermelho   
 Sabinópolis  
 Santa Maria do Suaçuí  
 São João Evangelista  
 São José do Jacuri   
 São Pedro do Suaçuí  
 São Sebastião do Maranhão  
 Senhora do Porto  
 Virginópolis

References 

Geography of Minas Gerais